Bauerbach is a village and a former municipality in the district of Schmalkalden-Meiningen, in Thuringia, Germany. Since 1 January 2012, it is part of the municipality Grabfeld.

References 

Former municipalities in Thuringia
Duchy of Saxe-Meiningen